Bliznak is a South Slavic toponym that may refer to:

Bliznak, Malko Tarnovo, in Bulgaria
Bliznak (Žagubica), in Serbia